Deborah Gates is an American actress and director who founded the acting company Shakespeare at Play in Los Angeles, California that specializes in abridged versions of Shakespeare’s works for young audiences.

Career
Gates has played many classical roles, including Ophelia in Mark Ringer's staging of Hamlet, Kate in Taming of the Shrew, Hermia in A Midsummer Night's Dream and Juliet in Romeo and Juliet at the Globe Playhouse as well as non classical roles in Mrs. California and Quilters, winning a Drama-Logue Award for the latter. She has also done extensive work as a voice actress in such films as Oliver & Company and video games like Guild Wars. She played the lead role of American journalist Helen Foster Snow in the Chinese film Yi ge mao xian de mei guo nu ren.

External links
 
 Official Website for Shakespeare at Play

American Shakespearean actresses
American stage actresses
American film actresses
American television actresses
American video game actresses
American voice actresses
Place of birth missing (living people)
Year of birth missing (living people)
American theatre directors
Women theatre directors
American theatre managers and producers
Living people
20th-century American actresses
21st-century American actresses